Chernov is a Slavic surname formed from the Russian word Chyorny meaning black. The feminine form of the surname is Chernova (or Tchernova). Some people with this name include:

 Alex Chernov (born 1938), an Australian judge, Chancellor of the University of Melbourne, and Governor of Victoria
 Alexander Chernov (1877–1963), a Soviet geologist, paleonthologist, and Hero of Socialist Labor
 Anatoly Chernov (1919–1953), a Soviet aircraft pilot and Hero of the Soviet Union
 Andrei Chernov (1966–2017), a Russian programmer, one of the founders of Runet and the creator of the KOI8-R character encoding
 Artyom Chernov (1982–2020), a Russian professional ice hockey centre
 Boris Chernov, designer of a series of light flying boats such as the Gidroplan Che-22 Korvet and the Chernov Che-25
 Dmitry Chernov (1839–1921), a Russian metallurgist
 Evgeniy Demitrievich Chernov, a Soviet admiral, former commander of Soviet submarine K-278 Komsomolets
 Georgy Chernov (April 21, 1906 – April 6, 2009) was a Russian geologist and Order "For Merit to the Fatherland"
 Matvei Chernov (1914–1944), a Soviet army officer and Hero of the Soviet Union
 Mikhail Chernov, a Russian ice-hockey player
 Mikhail Mikhaĭlovich Chernov (April 22, 1879 — August 1, 1938) a Russian composer and music professor
 Mstyslav Chernov (born 1985), an Associated Press journalist and photographer
 Natalia Chernova, a Russian gymnast
 Tatyana Chernova (born 1988), a Russian heptathlete
 Viktor Chernov (1873–1952), the founder of Socialist-Revolutionary Party
 Vladimir Chernov, famous singer at The Metropolitan Opera

See also 
Chernoff
Chernow
Chernon
Czernov
Černý
Czerny
Tschernow

Russian-language surnames